The 2012 Colorado State Rams football team represented Colorado State University in the 2012 NCAA Division I FBS football season. The Rams were led by first year head coach Jim McElwain and played their home games at Sonny Lubick Field at Hughes Stadium. They were members of the Mountain West Conference. They finished the season 4–8, 3–5 in Mountain West play to finish in a tie for sixth place.

Schedule

Game summaries

vs Colorado

North Dakota State

at San Jose State

Utah State

at Air Force

Fresno State

at San Diego State

Hawaii

at Wyoming

UNLV

at Boise State

New Mexico

References

Colorado State
Colorado State Rams football seasons
Colorado State Rams football